The 1993 Australian Touring Car season was the 34th year of touring car racing in Australia since the first runnings of the Australian Touring Car Championship and the fore-runner of the present day Bathurst 1000, the Armstrong 500.

There were 15 touring car race meetings held during 1993; a nine-round series, the 1993 Australian Touring Car Championship (ATCC); a three-round series based at Amaroo Park; the Aurora AFX AMSCAR series (AMSCAR), a support programme event at the 1993 Australian Grand Prix, two stand alone long distance races, nicknamed 'enduros'; the Winfield Triple Challenge at Eastern Creek Raceway.

Results and standings

Race calendar
The 1993 Australian touring car season consisted of 15 events.

Winfield Triple Challenge
Held at Eastern Creek Raceway this was a pre-season race meeting which featured Superbikes and Drag Racing to complete the Winfield Triple Challenge.

Australian Touring Car Championship

Australian 2.0 Litre Touring Car Championship

Sandown 500

Tooheys 1000

Ultimate Peter Jackson Dash
This meeting was a support event of the 1993 Australian Grand Prix.

References

Linked articles contain additional references.

Australian Touring Car Championship
Supercar seasons
Touring Cars
1993 in V8 Supercars